Martin Eden is a 1979 5-episode Italian historical television series directed by Giacomo Battiato, based on the 1909 novel of the same name by Jack London. It broadcast from November 25, 1979 to December 23, 1979.

In Germany, it was first broadcast on Sunday, October 12, 1980 and the three following Sundays.

Cast

Production
Principal photography for the TV series took place in Italy. Christopher Connelly sailed in his schooner over the waves on Lake Como, not Alaska. He went looking for gold in Romania. The interior shots were taken in Rome.

Martin Eden soundtrack 
The Martin Eden theme song is performed by Billie Hughes. It is the vocal version of the composers’ theme, with music written by Italian composers Ruggero Cini and Dario Farina and lyrics by Bill Hughes.

Martin Eden was released as a single in Europe by CBS. The song charted in several territories.

References

External links
 

Italian television series
Television series based on novels
German television series
ZDF original programming
Television shows based on works by Jack London
Adventure television series